Zuzana Rabina Bachoríková (born 25 September 1961, in Bratislava, Czechoslovakia) is a Slovak artist and designer. Between 1976 and 1980 she studied at the School of Applied Arts in Bratislava, the department promotion and book design by Professor Gabriel Štrba and Dusan Králik. She lives in Bratislava. Bachoríková dedicated her life to painting, drawing, graphic design, illustration, fashion and interior design. She is the co-founder of the fashion brand ZURABA. Her works are represented in the collections of galleries in Slovakia, the Czech Republic, Japan, Switzerland, the Netherlands, Belgium, Africa, Australia and the United States.

Paintings by Bachoríková bear witness to a long-time effort to create her own expression resulting for her personal feeling and strongly experienced colour chord, her paintings are intimate and personal too. She materializes images that can be seen in meditation: images that may be glimpsed under one´s eyelids. Each painting has many layers of meaning, a lot of symbolism and fantasy, transcending the boundaries of time and space. Each composition is based on effort to use maximum imagination, on bold colouring, and sometimes on sharp colour pigments as dominant structural elements and on the author´s independent poetics resulting from projection and conjunction of different semantic contexts.

Bachorikova is married to artist Oto Bachorik, and they have a son, Jakub Bachorik, who is an artist in Eastern Europe and a daughter who is an actress and lives in England.

References

External links
 http://theculturetrip.com/europe/slovakia/articles/10-slovak-artists-you-should-know/
Zuraba.com
Gmab.sk
Byvanie.pravda.sk
 http://theculturetrip.com/europe/slovakia/articles/10-slovak-artists-you-should-know/

1961 births
Living people
Artists from Bratislava
Slovak designers
Slovak painters
Slovak women artists